Lensvik is a village in Orkland municipality in Trøndelag county, Norway. The village is located on the western shore of the Trondheimsfjorden, just north of the village of Selbekken.

Attractions
Lensvik is often called the strawberry capital of Norway. The strawberries are sought after as far as the United States and France.  The strawberry season runs from July to August. The first week of July also holds the annual strawberry festival.

Bi-annually, Lensvik holds "Street-Meets" bolstering the largest engines driven by the largest egos. It's not uncommon to see a large plume of smoke hovering over one of the main parking lots in the village's center. Families come out and bring the young to see the festivities which include smoking tires from street rods to ATVs. There are even a couple of Arctic Ramblers pushing several hundred horsepower that can turn the tires to the tune of a loud squeal.

Media gallery

References

Orkland
Villages in Trøndelag